The Tourette's Disorder Scale (TODS) is a psychological measure used to assess tics and co-occurring conditions in tic disorders.

References 

Mental disorders screening and assessment tools
Tourette syndrome